The Island-class patrol vessel was first designed and built for the Scottish Fisheries Protection Agency. As a result of the Royal Navy's experiences in the Cod Wars with Iceland, FPV Jura (loaned to the Navy as ) and FPV Westra were put in fishery protection patrols, the Navy built a further seven. These ships were designed and built by Hall Russell of Aberdeen, Scotland.

Fishery protection cruisers
FPV Jura and FPV Westra were built by Hall, Russell & Company of Aberdeen in 1973 and 1975 respectively. Jura was loaned to the Royal Navy between 1975 and 1977 for evaluation.

Royal Navy offshore fishery protection ships
The success of Jura encouraged the Royal Navy to build a further seven ships to the same design; these ships formed the bulk of the Fishery Protection Squadron, whose mission was to patrol the Atlantic fishing grounds, and ensure the security of the British oil and gas fields in the North Sea. However, since the mid-1990s, the class has been gradually decommissioned; Jersey was sold to the Bangladesh Navy in 1994, to be followed by Shetland, Alderney, Anglesey, Guernsey and Lindisfarne, with Orkney going to Trinidad and Tobago.

Ships in class

Disposal
Presently, five Island-class patrol vessels are in active service with the Bangladesh Navy. Another ex-Royal Navy Island-class vessel, Jersey, was used as the training ship, Shaheed Ruhul Amin. The final ship of the class, ex-Royal Navy vessel Orkney is in service with the Trinidad and Tobago Coast Guard and named TTS Nelson.

The Scottish Fisheries Protection Agency Westra was sold to the Sea Shepherd Conservation Society in 2006 and renamed . Jura was sold in 1988 and renamed Criscilla, and then N'Madi.  She was broken up in Portugal in November 2001.

References

Footnotes

Bibliography

 
Patrol vessels of the United Kingdom
Patrol ship classes
Ship classes of the Royal Navy
Ships built in Aberdeen
Vehicles introduced in 1976
1976 establishments in Scotland